Birds of America may refer to:

Birds of America (book), a book by John James Audubon first published in sections between 1827 and 1838
Birds of America (film), a 2008 film directed by Craig Lucas.
Birds of America (novel), a 1971 novel by Mary McCarthy
Birds of America (stories), a 1998 collection of stories by Lorrie Moore

See also
:Category:Lists of birds of the United States
Birds of North America (book), an encyclopedia